Sir George Macpherson-Grant, 3rd Baronet DL (12 August 1839 – 5 December 1907) was a Scottish landowner, cattle breeder and Liberal politician.

Macpherson-Grant was the son of Sir John Macpherson-Grant, 2nd Baronet of Ballindalloch and his wife Marion Helen Campbell, daughter of Mungo Nutter Campbell. He was educated at Harrow School and at Christ Church, Oxford and succeeded to the Baronetcy Macpherson-Grant, of Ballindalloch, co. Banff at the age of 11 on the death of his father on 2 December 1850. 
Macpherson had the oldest herd of polled Aberdeen Angus cattle in Scotland when he started improving the breed. In 1860, he bought a cow named Erica from the Earl of Southesk's Kinnaird herd which started a famous Ballindalloch bloodline. He was considered one of the greatest exhibitors of the breed, and won prizes at all the major shows, including first prize at the Paris Exhibition of 1878. Macpherson-Grant also leased the site for the foundation of the Cragganmore whisky distillery in 1869. He was a J.P. and a deputy lieutenant for Banffshire and Inverness.

In 1879 Macpherson-Grant was elected Member of Parliament for Elginshire and Nairn. He held the seat until 1886 when as a Unionist he was defeated by Charles Henry Anderson a Gladstonian Liberal.

He was chairman of the Highland Railway from 1897–1900.

Macpherson-Grant lived at Ballindalloch Castle, Elgin and Invereshie House, Inverness. He died at the age of 68.

Macpherson-Grant married Frances Elizabeth Pocklington, daughter of Reverend Roger Pocklington of Walesby, Nottinghamshire on 3 July 1861. He was succeeded in the baronetcy by his son John Macpherson-Grant, 4th Baronet.

References

External links 
 

1839 births
1907 deaths
People educated at Harrow School
Alumni of Christ Church, Oxford
Baronets in the Baronetage of the United Kingdom
Deputy Lieutenants of Inverness-shire
Scottish Liberal Party MPs
Members of the Parliament of the United Kingdom for Scottish constituencies
UK MPs 1874–1880
UK MPs 1880–1885
UK MPs 1885–1886
Scottish landowners
Liberal Unionist Party MPs for Scottish constituencies
Highland Railway
Scottish justices of the peace
19th-century Scottish businesspeople